Bernauer is a surname. Notable people with the surname include:

Agnes Bernauer (1410–1435), the commoner wife of Albert III, Duke of Bavaria
Anna Bernauer (born 1986), Luxembourgish figure skater who competed for her entire career for Luxembourg
David Bernauer, the former chairman and CEO of the pharmacy chain Walgreens
Rudolf Bernauer (1880–1953), Austrian lyricist, librettist, screenwriter, film director, producer, and actor
Vanessa Bernauer (born 1988), Swiss football midfielder

See also 
 Bernauer Straße, street of Berlin between Gesundbrunnen and Mitte
 Bernauer Strasse (Berlin U-Bahn), Berlin U-Bahn station located on the U8

German-language surnames